Cassida atrata is a beetle in the leaf beetle family, that can be found in Central and SE Europe. The host plants are in the family Lamiaceae and include Salvia glutinosa and Salvia pratensis.

References

Cassidinae
Beetles described in 1787
Beetles of Europe
Taxa named by Johan Christian Fabricius